Lieutenant General Sir John Jarvis Bisset KCMG, CB (25 December 1819 – 25 March 1894) was a British Army officer who became colonel of the 106th Regiment of Foot.

Military career
Bisset arrived in South Africa as a child in 1820 and, having been commissioned as an ensign in the Cape Mounted Riflemen in 1835, fought in the 6th, 7th and 8th Frontier wars. He became Commanding officer of his regiment and went on to be acting Governor of Natal in 1865. He also became colonel of the 106th Regiment of Foot.

References

Governors of Natal
British Army lieutenant generals
106th Regiment of Foot officers
1819 births
1894 deaths
Knights Commander of the Order of St Michael and St George
Companions of the Order of the Bath